The ILTF Grand Prix tennis circuit was a professional tennis tour for male players that existed from 1970 to 1989. The Grand Prix and World Championship Tennis (WCT) were the two predecessors to the current tour for male players, the ATP Tour, with the Grand Prix being more prominent.

Background
Before the Open Era, popular professional tennis players, such as Suzanne Lenglen and Vincent Richards, were contracted to professional promoters. Amateur players were under the jurisdiction of their national (and international) federations. Later professional promoters, such as Bill Tilden and Jack Kramer, often convinced leading amateurs like Pancho Gonzales and Rod Laver to join their tours with promises of good prize money. But these successes led to financial difficulties when players were paid too much and falling attendances resulted in reduced takings.

In the early 1960s, the professional tour began to fall apart. It survived only because the U.S. Pro Tennis Championships, having been unable to give prize money to its 1963 winner, received prize money from the First National Bank of Boston for its 1964 tournament. At the same time, the concept of "shamateurism" – amateur promoters paying players under the table to ensure they remained amateurs – had become apparent to Herman David, the chairman of the Wimbledon Championships.

In 1967, David announced that a professional tournament would be held at the All England Lawn Tennis and Croquet Club after the 1967 Wimbledon Championships. This tournament was televised by the BBC and built public support for professional tennis. In late 1967, the best of the amateur players turned professional, paving the way for the first open tournament. Some professionals were independent at this time, such as Lew Hoad, Luis Ayala, and Owen Davidson, but most of the best players came under contract to one of two professional tours:

The National Tennis League (NTL), run by George McCall and Fred Podesta.
Rod Laver, Roy Emerson, Ken Rosewall, Andrés Gimeno, Pancho Gonzales, and Fred Stolle
World Championship Tennis (WCT), run by David F. Dixon, Albert G. Hill Jr., and Lamar Hunt.
Handsome Eight: John Newcombe, Tony Roche, Niki Pilić, Roger Taylor, Pierre Barthès, Butch Buchholz, Cliff Drysdale, and Dennis Ralston.

When the Open Era began in 1968, tournaments often found themselves deprived of NTL or WCT players. The first open tournament, the British Hard Court Championships at Bournemouth, was played without WCT players, as was that year's French Open. In 1970, NTL players did not play the Australian Open because their organization did not receive a guarantee.

Formation of the Grand Prix
The manipulation of Grand Slam tournaments by professional promoters at the start of the Open Era led promoter Jack Kramer, the top male tennis player in the world in the 1940s and 1950s, to conceive of the Grand Prix in 1969. He described it as "a series of tournaments with a money bonus pool that would be split up on the basis of a cumulative point system." This would encourage the best players to compete regularly in the series, so that they could share in the bonus at the end and qualify for the special championship tournament climaxing the year.

When only a few contract players showed up for the 1970 French Open, the International Lawn Tennis Federation (ILTF) approved Kramer's Grand Prix proposal. In April 1970, its president Ben Barnett announced the creation of the Grand Prix circuit, on an experimental basis during its first year.

The first World Championship Tennis tournament was held 20 January 1968 in Sydney, Australia. The first NTL tournament was held 18-21 March  1968 in São Paulo, Brazil. In July 1970, the WCT absorbed the NTL. In 1971, WCT ran a twenty-tournament circuit with the year-ending WCT Finals held in November. At the end of 1970, a panel of journalists had ranked the best players in the world. The best thirty-two men based on this ranking were invited to play the 1971 WCT circuit, which included Ilie Năstase, Stan Smith, Jan Kodeš, Željko Franulović, and Clark Graebner.

The Australian Open was part of the WCT circuit while the French Open, Wimbledon and the US Open were Grand Prix events. The conflict between the ILTF (running the Grand Prix) and WCT was so strong that Rosewall, Gimeno, Laver, Emerson, and other WCT players boycotted the 1971 US Open. The third professional circuit that year was the U. S. Indoor Circuit run by Bill Riordan, the future manager of Jimmy Connors.

In July 1971, the ILTF voted to ban all WCT contract professionals from competing in ILTF tournaments and from using ILTF facilities from the beginning of 1972 onwards. The 1972 editions of the French Open and the Wimbledon Championships excluded all contract professional players. Then in April 1972, the ILTF and WCT agreed to divide the 1973 tour into a WCT circuit that ran from January through May and a Grand Prix circuit that ran for the rest of the year. The conflict between the ILTF and WCT led all tennis players to attend the 1972 US Open where they agreed to form their own syndicate, the Association of Tennis Professionals (ATP), through the efforts of Jack Kramer, Donald Dell, and Cliff Drysdale.

In 1973, there were four rival professional circuits: the WCT circuit battled with the U. S. Indoor Circuit from January to April and the Grand Prix until July; both tours competed with the "European Spring Circuit" until June.

In that same year, the ATP created controversy by calling for a boycott of the 1973 Wimbledon Championships after one of its members, Niki Pilić, was suspended by the Yugoslav Tennis Federation for failing to play in a Davis Cup tie against New Zealand. The ATP boycott went ahead after negotiations failed, with only three members of the organisation – Roger Taylor, Ilie Năstase, and Ray Keldie – breaking the picket. They were later fined for this. The men's draws for that year were subsequently made up of second-string players, lucky losers, and older players such as Neale Fraser, who reached the final of the men's doubles with fellow Australian John Cooper. The draw also showcased future talents such as Björn Borg, Vijay Amritraj, Sandy Mayer, and John Lloyd amid record crowds.

Governance
The governance of the Grand Prix was led by the Men's International Professional Tennis Council (MIPTC) from 1974 through 1989. (Its name was shortened to the Men's Tennis Council (MTC) in 1988.) The MIPTC's duties included imposing fines for violations of its Code of Conduct, drug testing, and administrating the Grand Prix circuit. It also moved the Australian Open from its December date – which had been adopted in 1977 so that it could be included in the Grand Prix points system – to January for the 1987 edition so that the Grand Prix Masters could be held in December from 1986 onwards. It failed, however, to prevent the number of tournaments on the Grand Prix circuit from growing, with 48 being held in 1974 compared to 75 in 1989.

Integration and the end
The WCT and Grand Prix circuits were separate until 1978, when the Grand Prix circuit integrated the WCT circuit. In 1982, the WCT circuit split from the Grand Prix again and created a more complex WCT ranking, similar to the ATP ranking. The split was short-lived, however, and in 1985 the Grand Prix absorbed the four remaining WCT tournaments.

During the 1988 US Open the ATP, led by then-World No. 1 Mats Wilander, staged an impromptu meeting known as the "Parking Lot Press Conference" during failed negotiations with the MTC over the organisation of the Grand Prix and key issues such as player fatigue. During this press conference, the ATP declared that it would be starting its own tour in 1990, meaning that the 1989 Grand Prix would effectively be its last. The final event of the Grand Prix was the Nabisco Masters Doubles held at the Royal Albert Hall 6-10 December 1989. Its last champions were Jim Grabb and Patrick McEnroe, who beat John Fitzgerald and Anders Järryd in the final.

Formation of the ATP Tour
In 1990, the Association of Tennis Professionals, led by Hamilton Jordan, replaced the MTC as the sole governing body of men's professional tennis and the ATP Tour was born. The nine most prestigious Grand Prix tournaments became known as the "Championship Series Single Week" from 1990 through 1995. In 1996, Mercedes began sponsoring these series of events, renamed as the "Super 9" until 1999. In 2000, they became known as the "Tennis Masters Series" until 2004, then the "ATP Masters Series" until 2009. They are now called the ATP World Tour Masters 1000. Grand Prix tournaments below this level were originally called the Grand Prix Super Series. They were retained by the ATP and renamed as the "Championship Series". All remaining Grand Prix Tour events became part of the "World Series".

Sponsors and Grand Prix tour names
Based on USLTA Tennis Yearbooks and Guides and World of Tennis yearbooks the history of sponsors is as follows:
 1970 Pepsi-Cola Grand Prix 
 1971 Pepsi-Cola Grand Prix
 1972 Commercial Union Assurance Grand Prix
 1973 Commercial Union Assurance Grand Prix
 1974 Commercial Union Assurance Grand Prix
 1975 Commercial Union Assurance Grand Prix
 1976 Commercial Union Assurance Grand Prix
 1977 Colgate-Palmolive Grand Prix 
 1978 Colgate-Palmolive Grand Prix
 1979 Colgate-Palmolive Grand Prix
 1980 Volvo Grand Prix
 1981 Volvo Grand Prix
 1982 Volvo Grand Prix
 1983 Volvo Grand Prix
 1984 Volvo Grand Prix 
 1985 Nabisco Grand Prix
 1986 Nabisco Grand Prix
 1987 Nabisco Grand Prix
 1988 Nabisco Grand Prix 
 1989 Nabisco Grand Prix

Grand Prix season-end rankings
NB: All rankings were calculated using the Grand Prix points system and do not necessarily reflect the ATP rankings at the same time.

 1970
  C. Richey
  A. Ashe
  K. Rosewall
  R. Laver
  S. Smith
  Ž. Franulović
  J. Newcombe
  J. Kodeš
  T. Roche
  B. Carmichael
 1971
  S. Smith
  I. Năstase
  Ž. Franulović
  J. Kodeš
  C. Richey
  J. Newcombe
  P. Barthès
  K. Rosewall
  C. Graebner
  To. Gorman
 1972
  I. Năstase
  S. Smith
  M. Orantes
  J. Kodeš
  A. Gimeno
  B. Hewitt
  J. Connors
  To. Gorman
  A. Pattison
  P. Proisy
 1973
  I. Năstase
  J. Newcombe
  T. Okker
  J. Connors
  M. Orantes
  J. Kodeš
  S. Smith
  To. Gorman
  B. Borg
  A. Ashe
 1974
  G. Vilas
  J. Connors
  M. Orantes
  B. Borg
  R. Ramírez
  I. Năstase
  O. Parun
  H. Solomon
  A. Ashe
  S. Smith

 1975
  G. Vilas
  M. Orantes
  B. Borg
  A. Ashe
  I. Năstase
  J. Connors
  R. Ramírez
  A. Panatta
  H. Solomon
  E. Dibbs
 1976
  R. Ramírez
  M. Orantes
  J. Connors
  E. Dibbs
  H. Solomon
  G. Vilas
  R. Tanner
  W. Fibak
  B. Gottfried
  B. Borg
 1977
  G. Vilas
  B. Gottfried
  B. Borg
  M. Orantes
  E. Dibbs
  R. Tanner
  R. Ramírez
  J. Connors
  V. Gerulaitis
  H. Solomon
 1978
  J. Connors
  B. Borg
  E. Dibbs
  R. Ramírez
  H. Solomon
  J. McEnroe
  G. Vilas
  B. Gottfried
  C. Barazzutti
  A. Ashe
 1979
  J. McEnroe
  B. Borg
  J. Connors
  G. Vilas
  V. Gerulaitis
  R. Tanner
  J. Higueras
  H. Solomon
  E. Dibbs
  V. Pecci

 1980
  J. McEnroe
  I. Lendl
  J. Connors
  B. Borg
  G. Mayer
  H. Solomon
  G. Vilas
  J. L. Clerc
  E. Teltscher
  B. Teacher
 1981
  I. Lendl
  J. McEnroe
  J. Connors
  J. L. Clerc
  G. Vilas
  B. Borg
  R. Tanner
  E. Teltscher
  V. Gerulaitis
  Y. Noah
 1982
  J. Connors
  G. Vilas
  I. Lendl
  J. McEnroe
  M. Wilander
  V. Gerulaitis
  J. Higueras
  J. Kriek
  A. Gómez
  S. Denton
 1983
  M. Wilander
  I. Lendl
  J. McEnroe
  J. Connors
  Y. Noah
  J. Arias
  J. Higueras
  A. Gómez
  J. L. Clerc
  E. Teltscher
 1984
  J. McEnroe
  J. Connors
  I. Lendl
  M. Wilander
  A. Gómez
  J. Nyström
  H. Sundström
  E. Teltscher
  A. Järryd
  T. Šmíd

 1985
  I. Lendl
  J. McEnroe
  M. Wilander
  S. Edberg
  B. Becker
  J. Connors
  Y. Noah
  A. Järryd
  J. Kriek
  J. Nyström
 1986
  I. Lendl
  B. Becker
  S. Edberg
  J. Nyström
  Y. Noah
  M. Wilander
  H. Leconte
  A. Gómez
  J. Connors
  M. Mečíř
 1987
  I. Lendl
  S. Edberg
  M. Wilander
  M. Mečíř
  B. Becker
  J. Connors
  P. Cash
  B. Gilbert
  T. Mayotte
  A. Gómez
 1988
  M. Wilander
  B. Becker
  S. Edberg
  A. Agassi
  I. Lendl
  H. Leconte
  J. Connors
  T. Mayotte
  J. Hlasek
  K. Carlsson
 1989

  I. Lendl
  B. Becker
  S. Edberg
  B. Gilbert
  J. McEnroe
  M. Chang
  A. Agassi
  A. Krickstein
  A. Mancini
  J. Berger

Grand Prix circuit winners

See also
History of tennis
World Championship Tennis tour
Tennis Pro Tours
ATP Tour

References

Further reading
 Bud Collins, History of Tennis: An Authoritative Encyclopedia and Record Book, New Chapter Press, USA, 2nd Edition, 2010.  . Accessed 11 October 2010.

 
Defunct tennis tours
Recurring sporting events established in 1970
Recurring sporting events disestablished in 1989